Bachman–Turner Overdrive were a Canadian rock group from Winnipeg, Manitoba.

Bachman–Turner Overdrive may also refer to:
 Bachman–Turner Overdrive (1973 album)
 Bachman–Turner Overdrive (1984 album)

See also
 Bachman–Turner Overdrive II (1973)